Leroy Bobby Stanton (April 10, 1946 – March 13, 2019) was a Major League Baseball outfielder. He played for the New York Mets, California Angels, and the Seattle Mariners. He died in a car crash on March 13, 2019.

Professional career

New York Mets
Stanton played two seasons with the Mets. In limited playing time he had five hits in 25 at bats with two RBIs, one double and one triple.

On December 10, Stanton was traded by the Mets with Francisco Estrada, Don Rose, and Nolan Ryan to the California Angels for Jim Fregosi, considered to be one of the worst trades the Mets have ever made.

California Angels
Stanton hit three home runs in a July 10,  game against the Baltimore Orioles to tie an Angels record.

Halos Heaven, a Los Angeles Angels blog, ranked Stanton as the 68th best Angel in franchise history saying; "Stanton saw a lot of action as an Angel, never truly excelling into greatness, never swooning into uselessness. That is why he and his 594 games under the Halo stand at number 68."

In five seasons with the Angels Stanton played 594 games with 443 hits, 47 home runs and 242 RBIs. He lost his starting job in right field to Bobby Bonds at the start of the 1976 season after Bonds was acquired from the New York Yankees for Mickey Rivers.

Seattle Mariners
Stanton was selected by the Mariners in the 1976 Major League Baseball expansion draft. In , Stanton hit a career-high 27 home runs for the Mariners.

In two seasons with the M's, Stanton played 226 games, acquiring 180 hits, 30 home runs and 114 RBIs.

References

External links

1946 births
2019 deaths
African-American baseball players
American expatriate baseball players in Japan
Angeles de Puebla players
Baseball players from South Carolina
California Angels players
Florida Instructional League Mets players
Greenville Mets players
Hanshin Tigers players
Major League Baseball right fielders
Marion Mets players
Memphis Blues players
New York Mets players
People from Latta, South Carolina
Raleigh-Durham Mets players
Road incident deaths in South Carolina
Seattle Mariners players
Tiburones de La Guaira players
American expatriate baseball players in Venezuela
Tidewater Tides players
Tigres de Aragua players
20th-century African-American sportspeople
21st-century African-American people